Irma Blohm (24 November 1909 – 1 January 1997) was a German politician of the Christian Democratic Union (CDU) and former member of the German Bundestag.

Life 
Irma Blohm had been a member of the CDU since 1949, she had been deputy chairwoman of the CDU regional women's committee since 1957 and chairwoman of the same committee since 1970. In 1973 she became deputy chairwoman of the CDU's Federal Women's Association. From 1969 onwards, she was deputy federal chairwoman of the CDU's Federal Expert Committee on Health Policy. In 1953 she was elected to the Hamburg Parliament (until 1957). In 1955, she was sent to the deputation of the social welfare authority.

From 1957 to 1969 Irma Blohm was a member of the German Bundestag. From 15 October 1968 to 1969 she was deputy chairperson of the CDU/CSU parliamentary group.

Literature

References

1911 births
1997 deaths
Members of the Bundestag for Hamburg
Members of the Bundestag 1965–1969
Members of the Bundestag 1961–1965
Members of the Bundestag 1957–1961
Female members of the Bundestag
20th-century German women politicians
Members of the Bundestag for the Christian Democratic Union of Germany
Members of the Hamburg Parliament
Commanders Crosses of the Order of Merit of the Federal Republic of Germany